The 2018–19 UEFA Europa League qualifying phase and play-off round began on 26 June and ended on 30 August 2018.

A total of 178 teams competed in the qualifying system of the 2018–19 UEFA Europa League, which includes the qualifying phase and the play-off round, with 35 teams in Champions Path and 143 teams in Main Path. The 21 winners in the play-off round (8 from Champions Path, 13 from Main Path) advanced to the group stage, to join the 17 teams that entered in the group stage, the 6 losers of the Champions League play-off round (4 from Champions Path, 2 from League Path), and the 4 League Path losers of the Champions League third qualifying round.

Teams

Champions Path

The Champions Path included all league champions which were eliminated from the Champions Path qualifying phase of the Champions League, and consisted of the following rounds:
Second qualifying round (18 teams): 18 teams which entered in this round (3 losers of the Champions League preliminary round and 15 of the 16 losers of the Champions League first qualifying round).
Third qualifying round (20 teams): 11 teams which entered in this round (1 loser of the Champions League first qualifying round which receives a bye and 10 losers of the Champions League second qualifying round), and 9 winners of the second qualifying round.
Play-off round (16 teams): 6 teams which entered in this round (losers of the Champions League third qualifying round), and 10 winners of the third qualifying round.

Below are the participating teams (with their 2018 UEFA club coefficients), grouped by their starting rounds.

Notes

Main Path

The Main Path included all cup winners and league non-champions which did not qualify directly for the group stage, and consisted of the following rounds:
Preliminary round (14 teams): 14 teams which entered in this round.
First qualifying round (94 teams): 87 teams which entered in this round, and 7 winners of the preliminary round.
Second qualifying round (74 teams): 27 teams which entered in this round, and 47 winners of the first qualifying round.
Third qualifying round (52 teams): 15 teams which entered in this round (including 2 League Path losers of the Champions League second qualifying round), and 37 winners of the second qualifying round.
Play-off round (26 teams): 26 winners of the third qualifying round.

Below are the participating teams (with their 2018 UEFA club coefficients), grouped by their starting rounds.

Notes

Format
Each tie is played over two legs, with each team playing one leg at home. The team that scores more goals on aggregate over the two legs advance to the next round. If the aggregate score is level, the away goals rule is applied, i.e. the team that scores more goals away from home over the two legs advances. If away goals are also equal, then extra time is played. The away goals rule is again applied after extra time, i.e. if there are goals scored during extra time and the aggregate score is still level, the visiting team advances by virtue of more away goals scored. If no goals are scored during extra time, the tie is decided by penalty shoot-out.

For the Champions Path, in the draws for each round, teams (whose identity is not known at the time of the draws) are divided into seeded and unseeded pots, which may contain different numbers of teams, based on the following principles:
In the second qualifying round draw, 15 of the 16 losers of the Champions League first qualifying round (excluding 1 team which receives a bye to the third qualifying round as decided by an additional draw held after the Champions League first qualifying round draw) are seeded, and the three losers of the Champions League preliminary round are unseeded.
In the third qualifying round draw, the ten losers of the Champions League second qualifying round are seeded, and the loser of the first qualifying round which receives a bye (whose identity is known at the time of the draw) and the nine winners of the second qualifying round are unseeded.
In the play-off round draw, the six losers of the Champions League third qualifying round are seeded, and the ten winners of the third qualifying round are unseeded.
In the beginning of the draws, a seeded team is drawn against an unseeded team, with the order of legs in each tie decided by draw, until one of the pots is empty. Afterwards, the remaining teams from the non-empty pot are drawn against each other, with the order of legs in each tie decided by draw.

For the Main Path, in the draws for each round, teams are seeded based on their UEFA club coefficients at the beginning of the season, with the teams divided into seeded and unseeded pots containing the same number of teams. A seeded team is drawn against an unseeded team, with the order of legs in each tie decided by draw. As the identity of the winners of the previous round is not known at the time of the draws, the seeding is carried out under the assumption that the team with the higher coefficient of an undecided tie advances to this round, which means if the team with the lower coefficient is to advance, it simply take the seeding of its opponent.

Prior to the draws, UEFA may form "groups" in accordance with the principles set by the Club Competitions Committee, but they are purely for convenience of the draw and do not resemble any real groupings in the sense of the competition. Teams from the same association or from associations with political conflicts as decided by UEFA may not be drawn into the same tie. After the draws, the order of legs of a tie may be reversed by UEFA due to scheduling or venue conflicts.

Schedule
The schedule was as follows (all draws were held at the UEFA headquarters in Nyon, Switzerland).

Matches may also be played on Tuesdays or Wednesdays instead of the regular Thursdays due to scheduling conflicts.

Preliminary round
The draw for the preliminary round was held on 12 June 2018, 13:00 CEST.

Seeding
A total of 14 teams were involved in the preliminary round draw. Seven teams were seeded and seven teams were unseeded. Teams from the same association could not be drawn into the same tie, and if such a pairing was drawn or was set to be drawn in the final tie, the second team drawn in the current tie would be moved to the next tie.

Matches

The first legs were played on 26 and 28 June, and the second legs on 5 July 2018.

First qualifying round
The draw for the first qualifying round was held on 20 June 2018, 12:00 CEST.

Seeding
A total of 94 teams were involved in the first qualifying round draw: 87 teams entering in this round, and the seven winners of the preliminary round. They were divided into nine groups: seven of ten teams, where five teams were seeded and five teams were unseeded, and two of twelve teams, where six teams were seeded and six teams were unseeded. Numbers were pre-assigned for each team by UEFA so that the draw could be held in one run for all groups with ten teams and one run for all groups with twelve teams.

Notes

Matches

The first legs were played on 10, 11 and 12 July, and the second legs on 17, 18 and 19 July 2018.

Second qualifying round
The draw for the second qualifying round Champions Path was held on 19 June 2018, 16:00 CEST, and the draw for the second qualifying round Main Path was held on 20 June 2018, 14:50 CEST.

Seeding
A total of 18 teams were involved in the second qualifying round Champions Path draw.
Seeded: 15 of the 16 losers of the Champions League first qualifying round (excluding the losers of the Champions League first qualifying round given a bye to the third qualifying round as decided by an additional draw held after the Champions League first qualifying round draw)
Unseeded: the three losers of the Champions League preliminary round
They were divided into three groups of six teams, where five teams were seeded and one team were unseeded. Teams from Serbia and Kosovo, and Bosnia Herzegovina and Kosovo, could not be drawn into the same tie, and if such a potential pairing was drawn, the second team drawn in the current tie would be moved to the next tie.

A total of 74 teams were involved in the second qualifying round Main Path draw: 27 teams entering in this round, and the 47 winners of the first qualifying round. They were divided into seven groups: five of ten teams, where five teams were seeded and five teams were unseeded, and two of twelve teams, where six teams were seeded and six teams were unseeded. Numbers were pre-assigned for each team by UEFA so that the draw could be held in one run for all groups with ten teams and one run for all groups with twelve teams.

Notes

Matches

The first legs were played on 26 July, and the second legs on 31 July, 1 and 2 August 2018.

Third qualifying round
The draw for the third qualifying round Champions Path was held on 23 July 2018, 12:45 CEST, and the draw for the third qualifying round Main Path was held on 23 July 2018, 14:00 CEST.

Seeding
A total of 20 teams were involved in the third qualifying round Champions Path draw.
Seeded: the 10 losers of the Champions League second qualifying round Champions Path
Unseeded: the loser of the Champions League first qualifying round which received a bye, and the 9 winners of the Europa League second qualifying round Champions Path
They were divided into two groups of ten teams, where five teams were seeded and five teams were unseeded.

Notes

A total of 52 teams were involved in the third qualifying round Main Path draw: 13 teams entering in this round, the 37 winners of the second qualifying round Main Path, and the two Champions League losers of the second qualifying round League Path. They were divided into five groups: four of ten teams, where five teams were seeded and five teams were unseeded, and one of twelve teams, where six teams were seeded and six teams were unseeded. Numbers were pre-assigned for each team by UEFA so that the draw could be held in one run for all groups with ten teams and one run for all groups with twelve teams.

Notes

Matches

The first legs were played on 7 and 9 August, and the second legs on 16 August 2018.

Play-off round
The draw for the play-off round was held on 6 August 2018, 13:30 CEST.

Seeding
A total of 16 teams were involved in the play-off round Champions Path draw.
Seeded: the six losers of the Champions League third qualifying round Champions Path
Unseeded: the 10 winners of the Europa League third qualifying round Champions Path
They were divided into two groups of eight teams, where three teams were seeded and five teams were unseeded.

A total of 26 teams, all winners of the third qualifying round Main Path, were involved in the play-off round Main Path draw. They were divided into three groups: two of eight teams, where four teams were seeded and four teams were unseeded, and one of ten teams, where five teams were seeded and five teams were unseeded. Numbers were pre-assigned for each team by UEFA so that the draw could be held in one run for all groups with eight teams and one run for all groups with ten teams.

Notes

Matches

The first legs were played on 23 August, and the second legs on 30 August 2018.

Top goalscorers
There were 848 goals scored in 314 matches in the qualifying phase and play-off round, for an average of  goals per match.

Source:

References

External links

1
June 2018 sports events in Europe
July 2018 sports events in Europe
August 2018 sports events in Europe
UEFA Europa League qualifying rounds